The Choral synagogue of Vitebsk was a synagogue in Vitebsk, Belarus. Known as the synagogue of Marc Chagall, its ruins have remained in the city since its destruction during World War II.

History 

The synagogue was created in 1630. It is most commonly known as being the synagogue of the artist Marc Chagall.

The synagogue was closed in 1929, and destroyed during World War II. Its ruins remain in the city of Vitebsk to this day, and have become a symbol of the decline of the Jewish community of Belarus. In recent years, the municipal government of Vitebsk has offered to sell the synagogue to anyone willing to rebuild it, on the condition that they restore the building as it was prior to its destruction.

References 

Synagogues in Belarus